Dark ambient (referred to as ambient industrial especially in the 1980s) is a genre of post-industrial music that features an ominous, dark droning and often gloomy, monumental or catacombal atmosphere, partially with discordant overtones. It shows similarities with ambient music, a genre that has been cited as a main influence by many dark ambient artists, both conceptually and compositionally. Although mostly electronically generated, dark ambient also includes the sampling of hand-played instruments and semi-acoustic recording procedures.

Etymology 
The term dark ambient was coined in the early 1990s by Roger Karmanik to describe the music of Raison d'être and related artists that are heavily associated with the Cold Meat Industry record label.

Origins and development
Dark ambient has its roots in the 1970s with the introduction of newer, smaller, and more affordable effects units, synthesizer and sampling technology. Early genre elements can be found on Throbbing Gristle's 1978 album D.o.A: The Third and Final Report of Throbbing Gristle, and in the soundtrack to the 1977 David Lynch film Eraserhead. Important early precursors of the genre were Tangerine Dream's early double-album Zeit (1972), which unlike most of their subsequent albums abandoned any notion of rhythm or definable melody in favour of "darkly" sinuous, occasionally disturbing sonics; and also, Affenstunde (1970) by fellow krautrock band Popol Vuh.

Projects like Lustmord, Nocturnal Emissions, and Zoviet France evolved out of industrial music during the 1980s, and were some of the earliest artists to create consistently dark ambient music. These artists make use of industrial principles such as noise and shock tactics, but wield these elements with more subtlety. Additionally, ambient industrial often has strong occultist tendencies with a particular leaning toward magick as expounded by Aleister Crowley, and chaos magic, often giving the music a ritualistic flavor.

The album Deep Listening by pioneering electronic and experimental composer Pauline Oliveros in collaboration with Stuart Dempster and Panaiotis released in 1989 as well as the album Zamia Lehmanni: Songs of Byzantine Flowers by Australian musical group SPK released in 1987 are also cited as having made a considerable impact on the development of dark ambient. 

In the 2020s, artists known for producing dark ambient work include acts associated with the Cryo Chamber record label, run by Simon Heath who has been composing dark ambient music for over two decades. The website "This Is Darkness" is devoted to the dark ambient genre in all its iterations.

Characteristics 

Dark ambient often consists of evolving dissonant harmonies of drones and resonances, low frequency rumbles and machine noises, sometimes supplemented by gongs, percussive rhythms, bullroarers, distorted voices and other found sounds, often processed to the point where the original sample cannot be recognized. For example, entire works may be based on radio telescope recordings (e.g. Arecibo's Trans-Plutonian Transmissions), the babbling of newborn babies (e.g. Nocturnal Emissions' Mouths of Babes), or sounds recorded through contact microphones on telegraph wires (e.g. Alan Lamb's Primal Image).

Generally, the music tends to evoke a feeling of solitude, melancholy, confinement, darkness, and isolation. However, while the theme in the music tends to be "dark" in nature, some artists create more organic soundscapes. The Symphonies of the Planets series, a collection of works by Brain/Mind Research inspired by audible-frequency plasma waves recorded by the Voyager unmanned space probes, can also be considered an organic manifestation of dark ambient.

Subgenres

Isolationism

Isolationism, also known as isolationist ambient, is a style of ambient music prominent in the 1990s. The term was coined by British musician Kevin Martin and first appeared in print in a September 1993 issue of The Wire magazine. He described it as a form of fractured, subdued music that "pushed away" listeners. In 1994 Martin curated a compilation album, Isolationism, collecting various examples of the genre.

Journalist David Segal referred to it as "ambient's sinister, antisocial cousin".

John Everall, owner of the Sentrax label, places the origins of "Isolationist" music in early industrial groups, krautrock, ambient music and experimental composers such John Cage, non-experimental composers such as Karlheinz Stockhausen, and others.

James Plotkin identifies Brian Eno's ambient works as the greatest influence on the isolationist scene, along with American experimental music such as Illusion of Safety. As Plotkin says,

See also

 List of dark ambient artists
 List of electronic music genres

References 

 
Electronic music genres
Ambient music
Industrial music
Dark music genres